This is a list of team records recognized by the National Hockey League through the end of the 2021–22 NHL season.

Season records 

During the first eight years the NHL existed, teams played between 18 and 36 games in a season. Beginning in 1926, teams played 44–60 games. This would end in 1949 where teams now play 70 or more games. There have been four instances since then when teams have played less than 70 games in a season. Both the 1994–95 season and 2012–13 season were reduced to 48 games due to lockouts. The 2019–20 season and 2020–21 season were reduced due to the COVID-19 pandemic. For more information, check the History of the National Hockey League.

1949–50 to present 
Most points: 132, by the 1976–77 Montreal Canadiens
Fewest points: 21, by the 1974–75 Washington Capitals
Most wins: 62, by the 1995–96 Detroit Red Wings and 2018–19 Tampa Bay Lightning
Fewest wins: 8, by the 1974–75 Washington Capitals
Most ties: 24, by the 1969–70 Philadelphia Flyers
Fewest ties: 2, by the 1992–93 San Jose Sharks
Most shootout wins: 15, by the 2007–08 Edmonton Oilers
Most shootout losses: 13, by the 2013–14 New Jersey Devils
Most losses: 71, by the 1992–93 San Jose Sharks
Fewest losses: 8, by the 1976–77 Montreal Canadiens
Most goals for: 446, by the 1983–84 Edmonton Oilers
Fewest goals for: 133, by the 1953–54 Chicago Black Hawks
Most goals against: 446, by the 1974–75 Washington Capitals
Fewest goals against: 131, by the 1953–54 Toronto Maple Leafs and 1955–56 Montreal Canadiens

1926–27 to 1948–49 
Most points: 83, by the 1943–44 Montreal Canadiens
Fewest points: 12, by the 1930–31 Philadelphia Quakers
Most wins: 38, by the 1929–30 Boston Bruins, 1943–44 Montreal Canadiens, and 1944–45 Montreal Canadiens
Fewest wins: 4, by the 1930–31 Philadelphia Quakers
Most ties: 15, by the 1928–29 Montreal Canadiens and 1942–43 Chicago Black Hawks
Fewest ties: 1, by the 1929–30 Boston Bruins
Most losses: 39, by the 1943–44 New York Rangers
Fewest losses: 5, by the 1943–44 Montreal Canadiens and 1929–30 Boston Bruins
Most goals for: 234, by the 1943–44 Montreal Canadiens
Fewest goals for: 33, by the 1928–29 Chicago Black Hawks
Most goals against: 310, by the 1943–44 New York Rangers
Fewest goals against: 43, by the 1928–29 Montreal Canadiens

1917–18 to 1925–26 
Most points: 52, by the 1925–26 Ottawa Senators
Fewest points: 8, by the 1919–20 Quebec Athletics
Most wins: 24, by the 1925–26 Ottawa Senators
Fewest wins: 4, by the 1919–20 Quebec Athletics
Most ties: 5, by the 1925–26 Montreal Maroons
Most losses: 24, by the 1924–25 Boston Bruins
Fewest losses: 5 by the 1919–20 Ottawa Senators
Most goals for: 129, by the 1919–20 Montreal Canadiens
Fewest goals for: 45, by the 1924–25 Montreal Canadiens
Most goals against: 177, by the 1919–20 Quebec Bulldogs
Fewest goals against: 42, by the 1925–26 Ottawa Senators

Other season records 
Greatest points percentage: .875, by the 1929–30 Boston Bruins
Lowest points percentage: .131, by the 1974–75 Washington Capitals
Greatest goal differential: +216, by the 1976–77 Montreal Canadiens
Lowest goal differential: -265, by the 1974–75 Washington Capitals
Best power play percentage in a season: 31.88%, by the 1977–78 Montreal Canadiens
Worst power play percentage in a season: 8.94%, by the 2020–21 Anaheim Ducks
Best penalty kill percentage in a season: 89.58%, by the 2011–12 New Jersey Devils
Worst penalty kill percentage in a season: 67.70%, by the 1979–80 Los Angeles Kings
Best home record: 36–2–2 by the 1975–76 Philadelphia Flyers
Worst home record: 7–28–5 by the 1974–75 Washington Capitals
Best away record: 31–7–3 by the 2005–06 Detroit Red Wings
Worst away record: 1–41–0, by the 1992–93 Ottawa Senators
Most shutout wins in a season: 22 of 44 games played (50.0%), by the 1928–29 Montreal Canadiens
Most shutout losses in a season: 20 of 44 games played (45.5%), by the 1928–29 Chicago Black Hawks

Notes:
Ties were only recorded until 2003–04. In 1983, the NHL added a five-minute overtime, and ties would only occur after 65 minutes. Starting in 1999, teams played with only four skaters (unless they were on a two-man advantage, when they would be awarded an extra skater until the next stoppage). Starting in 2015 the NHL began 3-on-3 overtime periods. Starting with the 1999-2000 season, the NHL credited one point to the team that lost in overtime, leading to a system in which teams could potentially earn three points between them in a single game, rather than a fixed number of two previously. In 2005, the league eliminated ties meaning that any game which went to overtime would be a three-point game. Games that didn't end in overtime would end in a shootout between the two teams. These changes in points awarded therefore make strict comparisons in wins, losses, and ties (after overtime, 1983–99, and in regulation, 1999–present) before and after these dates slightly problematic.

Postseason records 
Longest playoff game: Detroit Red Wings vs Montreal Maroons on March 24, 1936 (60 minutes of regulation, 116 minutes, 30 seconds of overtime for a total of 176 minutes and 30 seconds. This game had 6 20-minute overtime periods).
Most playoff games played (all teams): 130, during the 2020 Stanley Cup playoffs
Most playoff games played (one team): 27, by 2019–20 Dallas Stars
Most home playoff games won (one season): 12, by 2002–03 New Jersey Devils
Most away playoff games won (one season): 10, by 1994–95 New Jersey Devils, 1999–2000 New Jersey Devils, 2003–04 Calgary Flames, 2011–12 Los Angeles Kings, 2017–18 Washington Capitals, 2018–19 St. Louis Blues, 2019–20 Dallas Stars and 2019–20 Tampa Bay Lightning
Most playoff overtime games won (one season): 10, by 1992–93 Montreal Canadiens
Most Stanley Cup-clinching overtime wins: 4, by the Montreal Canadiens (1944, 1953, 1966, 1977)
Most playoff games won by an expansion team in their inaugural season: 13, by 2017–18 Vegas Golden Knights
Most playoff games played without appearing in the Stanley Cup Finals (one season): 22, by 2019–20 New York Islanders
Most playoff games lost (one season): 12, by 2013–14 New York Rangers, 2014–15 Tampa Bay Lightning and 2019–20 Dallas Stars
Most Stanley Cup-clinching overtime losses: 2, by the Toronto Maple Leafs (1933, 1940), Montreal Canadiens (1951, 1954), Detroit Red Wings (1934, 1966), Boston Bruins (1953, 1977), Philadelphia Flyers (1980, 2010), and New York Rangers (1950, 2014)
Most consecutive playoff games won: 14, by Pittsburgh Penguins (Streak started on May 9, 1992 with three straight wins against the New York Rangers, four against Boston, four against Chicago in the Final, then three straight against New Jersey the next year. The streak would end on April 25, 1993 with a 4–1 loss to New Jersey.)
Most consecutive playoff games won in a single season: 11, by 1991–92 Chicago Blackhawks, 1991–92 Pittsburgh Penguins, and 1992–93 Montreal Canadiens
Most consecutive playoff games lost: 16, by Chicago Blackhawks from April 20, 1975 to April 8, 1980.

Postseason goals scored 
Most playoff goals scored in a series by one team: 44, by the Edmonton Oilers against the Chicago Black Hawks during the 1985 Stanley Cup playoffs
Most playoff goals scored in a series by both teams: 69, (44 by the Edmonton Oilers and 25 by the Chicago Black Hawks)
Fewest playoff goals scored in a series by one team: 1, by the Minnesota Wild against the Mighty Ducks of Anaheim
Fewest playoff goals scored in a series by winning team: 7, by the Vegas Golden Knights against the Los Angeles Kings
Fewest playoff goals scored in a series by both teams: 10, (7 by the Vegas Golden Knights and 3 by the Los Angeles Kings), (9 by the Mighty Ducks of Anaheim and 1 by the Minnesota Wild)
Most playoff goals scored by one team in one game: 13, by the Edmonton Oilers on April 9, 1987
Most playoff goals scored by one team in one period: 7, by the Montreal Canadiens on March 30, 1944
Most playoff goals scored by both teams in one game: 18, (Los Angeles Kings had 10 and the Edmonton Oilers 8) on April 7, 1982
Most playoff goals scored by both teams in one period: 9, by the New York Rangers (6) and the Philadelphia Flyers (3) on April 24, 1979 and the Los Angeles Kings (5) and the Calgary Flames (4) on April 10, 1990
Most consecutive playoff games played without a power play goal: 10, by the 2013–14 New York Rangers
Most consecutive playoff power play chances without a goal: 36, by 2013–14 New York Rangers

Season streaks 
Longest Winning Streak
Overall: 17 games, by 1992–93 Pittsburgh Penguins
Home: 23 games, by 2011–12 Detroit Red Wings
Away: 12 games, by 2005–06 Detroit Red Wings and 2014–15 Minnesota Wild

Longest Winning Streak to Start the Season
Overall: 10 games, by 1993–94 Toronto Maple Leafs and 2006–07 Buffalo Sabres
Home: 14 games, by the 2022–23 Boston Bruins
Away: 10 games, by 2006–07 Buffalo Sabres

Longest Winning Streak to End the Season
Overall: 11 games, by 2005–06 New Jersey Devils

Longest Undefeated Streak
Overall: 35 games, by 1979–80 Philadelphia Flyers (25 wins, 10 ties)
Home: 34 games, by 1976–77 Montreal Canadiens
Away: 23 games, by 1974–75 Montreal Canadiens

Longest Undefeated Streak to End the Season
Overall: 18 games, by 1992–93 Pittsburgh Penguins (17 wins, one tie)

Longest Points Streak to Start the Season
Overall: 24 games, by 2012–13 Chicago Blackhawks (21 wins, 3 shootout losses)

Longest Shootout Winning Streak
Overall: 11 games, by 2005–06 Dallas Stars

Longest Shootout Losing Streak
Overall: 18 games, by 2013–14 and 2014–15 New Jersey Devils (March 15, 2013 to October 24, 2014)

Longest Losing Streak
Overall: 18 games, by 2003–04 Pittsburgh Penguins and by 2020–21 Buffalo Sabres
Home: 14 games, by 2003–04 Pittsburgh Penguins
Away: 38 games, by 1992–93 Ottawa Senators

Longest Losing Streak to Start the Season
Overall: 11 games, by 1943–44 New York Rangers and 2017–18 Arizona Coyotes

Longest Winless Streak
Overall: 30 games, by 1980–81 Winnipeg Jets (23 losses, 7 ties)
Home: 17 games, by 1995–96 Ottawa Senators and 1999–2000 Atlanta Thrashers
Away: 38 games, by 1992–93 Ottawa Senators

Longest Winless Streak to Start the Season
Overall: 15 games, by 1943–44 New York Rangers (14 losses, 1 tie)

Longest Consecutive Attendance Sellout:
633 games, by the Pittsburgh Penguins ended on October 19, 2021 (February 14, 2007 - October 16, 2021) (this record includes regular season and playoff games)

Notes:
 An undefeated streak includes wins and ties (although with the implementation of reduced-player overtime starting in 1998-99, ties are based at the end of regulation with each team earning one point, and the winner in overtime, or starting in 2005-06, the shootout, receiving a second point; the loser is credited with a point for regulation tie but given the overtime or shootout loss). A winless streak includes losses in regulation, overtime, shootouts, or ties. A losing streak includes losses in regulation (note from the implementation of overtime in 1983 until 1999, losses in overtime also counted, but abolished after overtime became reduced strength of four players each).

Regular season miscellaneous 
 Most penalty minutes in a season: 2713, by the 1991–92 Buffalo Sabres
 Most combined penalty minutes in a game: 419 (67 penalties), Ottawa Senators at Philadelphia Flyers on March 5, 2004 
 Most consecutive penalties killed: 53, by the 1999–2000 Washington Capitals
 Most shorthanded goals in a season: 36, by the 1983–84 Edmonton Oilers
 Fewest shorthanded goals allowed in a season: 0, by the 2013–14 Nashville Predators
 Most shorthanded goals in one penalty: 3, by the 2009–10 Boston Bruins vs the Carolina Hurricanes
 Most combined goals in a game: 21, Toronto St. Patricks vs. Montreal Canadiens on January 10, 1920 (Montreal won 14–7); Edmonton Oilers vs. Chicago Black Hawks on December 11, 1985 (Edmonton won 12–9).
 Largest goal differential: Detroit Red Wings 15, New York Rangers 0 on January 23, 1944.
 Most games going past regulation in a single day: 8 on February 22, 2007 and November 27, 2015.
 Most games decided in a shootout: 21, by the 2013–14 Washington Capitals (10 wins, 11 losses)
 Most shootout goals in a single game: 11, Florida Panthers 6, Washington Capitals 5, on December 16, 2014.
 Most shootout goals on consecutive attempts: 9, Florida Panthers 5, New York Islanders 4, on November 27, 2015.
 Most rounds in a shootout: 20, by the Washington Capitals vs the Florida Panthers on December 16, 2014.
 Most points without reaching playoffs: 96, by the 2014–15 Boston Bruins, the 2017–18 Florida Panthers and the 2018–19 Montreal Canadiens
 Fewest games to reach 100 points: 61, by the 2022–23 Boston Bruins
 Most Presidents' Trophies since introduction during the 1985–86 season: 6, by the Detroit Red Wings
 Fewest points in an 80 or more game season to win the Presidents' Trophy: 101, by the 1989–90 Boston Bruins
 Most seasons with the best regular season record: 20, by the Montreal Canadiens
 Most conference titles during the regular season: 9, by the Philadelphia Flyers, Montreal Canadiens, and Detroit Red Wings
 Most division titles: 26, by the  Boston Bruins
 Most consecutive division titles: 9 by the Quebec Nordiques/Colorado Avalanche (1 with final season in Quebec, 8 with Colorado)

Playoffs miscellaneous  
Most Stanley Cups: 23, by the Montreal Canadiens (the Canadiens have won the Stanley Cup 24 times in total. Their first Stanley Cup championship came in 1916 as a member of the NHA)
Oldest franchise without a stanley cup: Buffalo Sabres and Vancouver Canucks, 50 seasons since inception in 1970–71 season
Most consecutive Stanley Cup wins: 5, by the Montreal Canadiens (1956–1960)
Longest Stanley Cup drought: 54 seasons by the Toronto Maple Leafs (1968–ongoing)
Longest Stanley Cup Final drought (current): 54 seasons by the Toronto Maple Leafs (ongoing) (last appearance in 1967, includes season lost due to 2004–05 NHL lockout)
Most Stanley Cup Finals appearances: 33, by the Montreal Canadiens (the Canadiens reached the final in 1916 but this was before the formation of the NHL in 1917)
Oldest franchise(s) to have never reached the Stanley Cup Final: 39 seasons, by the Original Winnipeg Jets/Phoenix/Arizona Coyotes since inception in 1979–80 season
Most consecutive Stanley Cup Finals appearances: 10, by the Montreal Canadiens (1951–1960)
Most consecutive victories in the Stanley Cup Final: 10, by the Montreal Canadiens (1976–1978)
Most consecutive defeats in the Stanley Cup Final: 13, by the St. Louis Blues (1968–2019)
Most sweeps in the Stanley Cup Final since the best-of-seven format was introduced in 1939: 6, by the Montreal Canadiens (1944, 1960, 1968, 1969, 1976, 1977)
Longest playoff appearance streak: 29 years, by the Boston Bruins (1968–1996)
Longest postseason drought: 11 seasons by the Buffalo Sabres (2012–ongoing)
Most consecutive playoff series victories: 19, by the 1980–1984 New York Islanders, spanning four consecutive Stanley Cup titles and five playoff seasons.  This is a record for all North American professional sports franchises.
Most consecutive playoff series defeats: 12, by the Winnipeg Jets/Phoenix Coyotes from 1988–2011
Most comebacks from a 3–1 playoff series deficit: 3, by the Vancouver Canucks (1992, 1994, 2003), Montreal Canadiens (2004, 2010, 2021), and New York Rangers (2014, 2015, 2022)
Most comebacks from a 3–1 playoff series deficit in one season: 2, by the 2002–03 Minnesota Wild
Most consecutive seasons in the stanley cup playoffs where a team has rebounded from a 3–1 deficit in a series: 2, by the New York Rangers
Most 3–1 leads in a series to lose the last three games: 5 by the Washington Capitals (1987, 1992, 1995, 2010, 2015)
Teams to come back from a 3–0 series deficit: Toronto Maple Leafs (1942 over the Detroit Red Wings), New York Islanders (1975 over the Pittsburgh Penguins), Philadelphia Flyers (2010 over the Boston Bruins), Los Angeles Kings (2014 over the San Jose Sharks)
Notes: The 2004–05 season was cancelled due to a lockout. The Phoenix Coyotes changed their name to the Arizona Coyotes prior to the 2014–15 season

See also 
 List of National Hockey League records (individual)
 List of National Hockey League statistical leaders
 List of NHL statistical leaders by country
 List of NHL franchise post-season droughts

References 

Team
Records (team)